Cyril Argentine Alington (22 October 1872 – 16 May 1955) was an English educationalist, scholar, cleric, and author. He was successively the headmaster of Shrewsbury School and Eton College. He also served as chaplain to King George V and as Dean of Durham.

Early life
Dr Alington was the second son of the Rev. Henry Giles Alington, an inspector of schools, and his wife Jane Margaret Booth (d. 1910), daughter of Rev. Thomas Willingham Booth. His father came from a long line of clerics, a branch of the landed gentry Alington family of Little Barford Manor House, St Neots, Huntingdonshire, and was descended from the Alingtons of Horseheath, an ancient Cambridgeshire family, from which also descended the Barons Alington. He was educated at Marlborough College and Trinity College, Oxford. He gained a First in Classical Moderations (Latin and Greek) in 1893 and a First in Literae Humaniores (Philosophy and Ancient History) in 1895. He was elected a Fellow of All Souls College, Oxford in 1896. He was ordained as an Anglican priest in 1901.

Career
Alington's educational career began as a sixth-form master at Marlborough College in 1896. He moved to Eton College in 1899, but left to become headmaster of Shrewsbury School in 1908. In 1917 he returned to Eton to succeed his brother-in-law, Edward Lyttelton, as headmaster; he remained there until his retirement from teaching in 1933. He served as chairman of the Headmasters' Conference, 1924–25. At Eton, a building which houses much of the English department is now named after him, as is Shrewsbury's school hall.

From 1933 to 1951 Alington served as Dean of Durham. He had become a Doctor of Divinity at Oxford in 1917 and received other honours: he was chaplain to the King from 1921 until 1933; he was made an Honorary Fellow of Trinity College, Oxford in 1926, and an honorary DCL at Durham University in 1937. He received the freedom of the City of Durham in 1949.

He appeared on the cover of Time magazine on 29 June 1931. "An accomplished classicist, a witty writer especially of light verse, and a priest of orthodox convictions ..."

Marriage and family
In 1904, Alington married Hester Margaret Lyttelton (CBE; died 1958), the youngest daughter of George Lyttelton, 4th Baron Lyttelton. The couple had four daughters and two sons:

 Kathleen Lucy Alington (1908–1938)
 Elizabeth Hester Alington (1909–1990), married Sir Alec Douglas-Home, 14th Earl of Home), British prime minister
 Lavinia Sybil Alington (1911–1994), married Sir Roger Mynors, academic and classical scholar
 Giles Alington (1914–1956), Dean and Senior Tutor of University College, Oxford
 Joan Argentine Alington (1916–2000), married Rev. John Vaughan Wilkes,  Master in College and later housemaster at Eton, Warden of Radley College and later vicar of Marlow
 Patrick Cyril Waynflete Alington (1920–1943), killed at Salerno in World War II

Alington died at the age of 82 and was buried at Durham Cathedral, where there is a memorial in the north transept.

Literary works
Alington wrote more than 50 books, including works on religion, biography, history, poetry, and a series of detective novels. He also wrote several popular hymns, including Good Christian Men, Rejoice and Sing (recently altered to Good Christians All, Rejoice and Sing), Ye that know The Lord is gracious and The Lord of Hosts Our King Shall Be which is used as the epigraph to Nevil Shute's novel In the Wet. (Shute was a pupil at Shrewsbury.)

As C A Alington

Fiction
Mr Evans - A Cricket-Detective Story (1922)
Through the Shadows (1922)
Strained Relations (1922)
The Count in Kensington (1926)
King Harrison & Others (1923). King Harrison is a comic opera
The Abbot's Cup (1930)
Crime on the Kennet (1939)
Ten Crowded Hours (1944)
Archdeacons Afloat (1946)
Midnight Wireless (1947)
Archdeacons Ashore (1947)
Blackmail in Blankshire (1949)
Gold and Gaiters (1950)
The Nabob's Jewel (1953)
Blessed Blunders (1954).

Non-fiction works
A Schoolmaster's Apology (1914)
Shrewsbury Fables (1917)
Eton Fables (1921)
Twenty Years: Being a Study of the Party System, 1815–1835 (1921)
Virgil Aeneid IV-VI (1922 – translation of Virgil)
Why We Read the Old Testament (1924)
An Eton Poetry Book (1925 – an anthology co-edited with George Lyttelton)
More Eton Fables (1927)
Elementary Christianity (1927)
Doubts and Difficulties (1929)
Cautionary Catches (1931 – verses in Latin and English)
Christian Outlines: An Introduction to Religion (1932)
Final Eton Fables (1933)
Eton Faces Old and Young (1933)
Lionel Ford (1934)
The Fool Hath Said (1933)
Can We Believe in God? (1936)
Things Ancient and Modern (1936 – autobiographical book on English public schools)
The New Testament: A Reader's Guide (1938)
The Last Crusade (1940)
The Kingdom of God (1941)
Christianity in England: An Historical Sketch (1942)
Poets at Play (1942)
In Shabby Streets and Other Verses (1942)
Edward Lyttelton: An Appreciation (1943)
Good News (1945);
Europe: A Personal and Political Survey (1946)
The Life Everlasting (1947)
Durham Cathedral: The Story of a Thousand Years (1948)
Sense and Non-sense (1949)
A Dean's Apology: A Semi-religious Autobiography (1952)

Non-fiction articles
Apostle of Germany. Daily Telegraph, 1937
Is It Wrong to Pray - for Success, for Wealth, for Victory?. Answers, 1938

Poetry
To C. A. L.. (c. 1916); anthologized in The Muse in Arms
The King: A Psalm of Thanksgiving. (1929). Written for the thanksgiving service for the recovery of King George V for which it was set to music by Henry Walford Davies
To the School at War. (London) Times, 19 December 1914
Qui Laborat Orat. (London) Sunday Times, 11 January 1942
The Trust. The Methodist, 16 June 1945

References

The New Standard Encyclopedia and World Atlas 1932

Bibliography
Oxford Dictionary of National Biography
Burke's Landed Gentry, edited by Hugh Montgomery-Massingberd, 18th edition, London, 1972, volume 3, p. 11.

1872 births
1955 deaths
People educated at Marlborough College
Alumni of Trinity College, Oxford
English hymnwriters
English crime fiction writers
English essayists
Schoolteachers from Suffolk
Deans of Durham
Burials in County Durham
Fellows of All Souls College, Oxford
Head Masters of Eton College
Headmasters of Shrewsbury School